"Sofi Needs a Ladder" is a song by Canadian electronic music producer Deadmau5, featuring vocals from German singer SOFI. It was released as the third single from deadmau5's fifth studio album, 4×4=12.

Background
The song was originally an instrumental track, "You Need a Ladder", which Deadmau5 previously performed, but vocals were added on afterward to allow the song to be published and avoid any copyright infringement (the song previously included an intro and outro featuring a slightly remixed version of "Overworld theme" from the NES game The Legend of Zelda). The song was first played on the radio by Annie Mac on BBC Radio 1 on October 22, 2010. The song won a 2011 Juno Award for Best Dance Recording.

In popular culture
The single is featured on the soundtrack to the video game Need for Speed: Hot Pursuit.
During the finals of the seventh series of British show The X Factor, contestant Cher Lloyd performed a variation of the first verse of the song mashed up into "What a Feeling". "Sofi Needs a Ladder" is also played in the background during a club scene in the film The Hangover Part II, and was featured in a 2011 Virgin Mobile commercial. Sofi Needs a Ladder is also featured in the hit series Entourage during the season 8 house party for Vinnie Chase.

Track listing

Charts

References 

2010 singles
Deadmau5 songs
Songs written by Deadmau5
2010 songs
Virgin Records singles
Ultra Music singles
Juno Award for Dance Recording of the Year recordings